Strictly 4 My Fans is the fourth mixtape by American rapper G Herbo. It was released on November 24, 2016. Unlike his other mixtapes that were made for free download, this one was up for purchase.

Content
The mixtape features production from C-Sick, DJ L, Southside, DP Beats, Tapez, Chase Davis, Kid Deezy, Kid Marquis, and Charlie Handsome. It includes a guest feature by Lil Bibby.  The cover art was created by Canadian artist Pencil Fingerz.

Track listing

Reception

The mixtape received mostly positive reviews from Pitchfork and HipHopDX.

References

External links
Strictly 4 My Fans at AudioMack
Strictly 4 My Fans at DatPiff

2016 mixtape albums
G Herbo albums
Albums produced by C-Sick
Albums produced by Southside (record producer)